Carposina phycitana is a moth in the Carposinidae family. It was described by Walsingham in 1914. It is found in Panama.

References

Natural History Museum Lepidoptera generic names catalog

Carposinidae
Moths described in 1914
Moths of Central America